Ben Avon is an unincorporated area and census-designated place (CDP) adjacent to the city of Spartanburg in Spartanburg County, South Carolina, United States. It was first listed as a CDP prior to the 2020 census. The population as of 2020 was 2,428.

The CDP is in eastern Spartanburg County and is bordered to the northwest by the city of Spartanburg. It is bordered to the south by unincorporated Camp Croft.

U.S. Route 176 (South Pine Street) is the main road through the community, leading northwest  to the center of Spartanburg and southeast  to Union. South Carolina Highway 9 runs with US 176 along South Pine Street but leads east-southeast  to Chester. The W Line of the Norfolk Southern Railway forms the southern border of the CDP.

Demographics

2020 census

Note: the US Census treats Hispanic/Latino as an ethnic category. This table excludes Latinos from the racial categories and assigns them to a separate category. Hispanics/Latinos can be of any race.

References 

Census-designated places in Spartanburg County, South Carolina
Census-designated places in South Carolina